Bogoslov is a village in Kyustendil Municipality, Kyustendil Province, Bulgaria. Notable people include Velin Alaykov. 

Villages in Kyustendil Province